Florometra serratissima is a species of crinoid or feather star in the family Antedonidae. It is found off the Pacific coast of North America, usually in deep water.

Description
Like other feather stars, F. serratissima has a stalk, a calyx and a set of arms. The mouth is located on the upper side at the centre of the calyx, with the anus nearby. Surrounding the calyx are five jointed limbs. These branch at the base to form ten or more arms, each of which has jointed appendages known as pinnules growing from it, in a feather-like fashion. The centre of each arm has an ambulacral groove down which food particles are moved by cilia to the mouth. On the aboral (under) surface are clawlike cirri which grasp the seabed. This feather star is reddish-brown. Juveniles have a long stalk.

Distribution
F. serratissima is native to the Pacific coast of North America, its range extending from the Shumagin Islands and Sanak Islands off Alaska southward to Isla Natividad off Baja California.

Ecology
These crinoids can live on either rocks or soft sediment, and can move around using their cirri as feet, or can swim by beating their arms; they are suspension feeders, choosing locations with strong currents and extending their arms to catch plankton floating past. Although the arms of F. serratissima have special joints known as syzygies where they are designed to part when stressed, researchers grasping this crinoid found the arms invariably broke off at the base. If it loses an arm, by autotomy or predation, the arm can be regenerated, the speed of regeneration being independent of whether the regrowth is happening from a long or a short stump.

References

Antedonidae
Animals described in 1907